The 2008 Finnish Athletics Championships were held in the Ratina Stadion in Tampere from July 24 to July 27, 2008. The event served as a qualification tournament for the 2008 Summer Olympics staged from August 15 to August 24, 2008 in Beijing, PR China.

Results

See also
Finland at the 2008 Summer Olympics

References
live.time4results

External links

Finnish Athletics Championships
2008
Athletics Championships